Manuel V. Morán (October 27, 1893 – August 23, 1961) was the Chief Justice of the Supreme Court of the Philippines from July 9, 1945 until March 20, 1951.

Career
He graduated from his Bachelor of Laws degree at Escuela de Manila, 1913, and was admitted to the bar in 1913.

He started out as an auxiliary judge of Iloilo and Pampanga before being promoted as a full judge, and later, an Associate Justice of the Court of Appeals. He was appointed as Supreme Court Associate Justice in 1938 then elevated to the post as Chief Justice in July 1945.

After leaving office, he became the first Philippine Ambassador to Spain and the Holy See. Hoping to be appointed again to the Supreme Court, he was extended an ad interim appointment of outgoing president Elpidio Quirino in 1953, but Moran backed out, for he felt that President-elect Ramon Magsaysay would fill such vacancy. His reinstatement never materialized.

References

 Cruz, Isagani A. (2000). Res Gestae: A Brief History of the Supreme Court. Rex Book Store, Manila

1893 births
1961 deaths
Chief justices of the Supreme Court of the Philippines
People from Pangasinan
Justices of the Court of Appeals of the Philippines
Ambassadors of the Philippines to Spain
Associate Justices of the Supreme Court of the Philippines